The Liquid Scintillator Neutrino Detector (LSND) was a scintillation counter at Los Alamos National Laboratory that measured the number of neutrinos being produced by an accelerator neutrino source. The LSND project was created to look for evidence of neutrino oscillation, and its results conflict with the standard model expectation of only three neutrino flavors, when considered in the context of other solar and atmospheric neutrino oscillation experiments. Cosmological data bound the mass of the sterile neutrino to ms < 0.26eV (0.44eV) at 95% (99.9%) confidence limit, excluding at high significance the sterile neutrino hypothesis as an explanation of the LSND anomaly. The controversial LSND result was tested by the MiniBooNE experiment at Fermilab which has found similar evidence for oscillations.
The hint is currently undergoing further tests at MicroBooNE at Fermilab.

Cherenkov light emitted by particle interactions was detected by an array of 1220 photomultiplier tubes. The experiment collected data from 1993 to 1998.

References

Further reading

External links
LSND strengthens evidence for neutrino oscillations
LSND scientific publications
LSND scientific publications, SPIRES database
The Neutrino Oscillations Industry

Accelerator neutrino experiments